Tubulopathy is a disease affecting the renal tubules of the nephron.

Tubulopathic processes may be inflammatory or noninflammatory, though inflammatory processes are often referred to specifically as tubulitis.

AA: Aminoaciduria; AD:autosomal dominant; AR: autosomal recessive; LFT's: Liver function tests; LMWP: low molecular weight proteinuria; XD: X-linked dominant; XR: X-linked recessive; PTH: Parathyroid hormone

References

External links 

Kidney diseases